Greece participated in the Eurovision Song Contest 2014 with the song "Rise Up" written by Nick Raptakis, Theofilos Pouzbouris, Shane Schuller and performed by Freaky Fortune featuring RiskyKidd. The song was selected through the four-participant national final Eurosong 2014 – a MAD show, developed by Dimosia Tileorasi and organised and produced by the private music channel MAD TV.

Greece was drawn to compete in the second semi-final of the Eurovision Song Contest, which took place on 8 May 2014. Performing during the show in position 13, "Rise Up" was announced among the top 10 entries of the second semi-final and therefore qualified to compete in the final. It was later revealed that Greece placed 7th out of the 18 participating countries in the semi-final with 74 points. At the  final, held two days later, Greece performed 10th out of the 26 finalists and finished in 20th place with 35 points.

Background

To this point, the nation won the contest once, in 2005 with the song "My Number One" performed by Helena Paparizou, and placed third three times: in 2001 with the song "Die for You" performed by the duo Antique; in 2004 with "Shake It" performed by Sakis Rouvas; and in 2008 with "Secret Combination" performed by Kalomoira. Following the introduction of semi-finals for the 2004 contest, Greece qualified for the final each year. Their least successful result was in  when they placed 20th with the song "Mia krifi evaisthisia" by Thalassa, receiving only 12 points in total, all from Cyprus.

The Greek national broadcaster, Hellenic Broadcasting Corporation (ERT), is in charge of Greece's participation each year, including the selection process for its entry. Although its selection techniques have varied over the decades, the most common has been a national final in which various acts compete against each other with pre-selected songs, voted on by a jury, televoters, or both. In most cases, internal selections have been reserved for high-profile acts, with the song either being selected internally or with multiple songs —by one or multiple composers— performed by the artist during a televised final. A departure from this method was a reality television talent competition format inspired by the Idol series that ran for many months in 2004, ultimately being scrapped.

In August 2013, the Greek government shut down the radio and TV services of ERT, leaving Greece's future contest participation in question. Sietse Bakker, event supervisor of the contest, said regarding Greece's participation: the "EBU will do its best to have Greece on board, given the fact of the special occasion". It was also said that the Greek government has to form the new broadcaster, NERIT, so it would be eligible to participate. The nation subsequently confirmed on 22 November 2013 that it had applied to take part in the Eurovision Song Contest 2014 with interim broadcaster Dimosia Tileorasi (DT).

Before Eurovision

Eurosong 2014 – a MAD show 

Eurosong 2014 – a MAD show was the Greek national final developed by DT (the interim broadcasting channel prior to the launch of NERIT) to select the Greek entry for the Eurovision Song Contest 2014. Organized and produced by private music channel MAD TV, the competition took place on 11 March 2014 at the Acro Music Hall in Athens, hosted by Despina Vandi and Giorgos Kapoutzidis. The show was televised on DT as well as online via the DT website hprt.gr and the official Eurovision Song Contest website eurovision.tv. The national final simultaneously celebrated the 40th anniversary of the first Greek participation in the Eurovision Song Contest.

Competing entries 
Four artists, all signed to record labels Panik Records or its imprint Platinum Records, were invited by DT to participate in the national final. The four acts: Crystallia, Freaky Fortune feat. RiskyKidd, Kostas Martakis and Mark F. Angelo feat. Josephine were announced on 11 February 2014. Preview videos of the competing songs were presented on 5 March 2014 during a public news program on DT.

Final 

The final took place on 11 March 2014. Four songs competed and the winner, "Rise Up" performed by Freaky Fortune feat. RiskyKidd, was selected by a 50/50 combination of public voting and jury voting. The jury consisted of Dimitris Kontopoulos (producer), Elpida (singer), Themis Georgantas (television producer and radio host), Areti Kalesaki (DT Public Relations representative) and Reggina Kouri (Head of Public Relations for MAD TV). Public voting was conducted through telephone or SMS.

In addition to the performances of the competing entries, the interval acts featured guest performances by singers Paschalis Arvanitidis, Marianna Toli, Robert Williams, Bessy Argyraki, Melisses, Elpida, Tamta, Sophia Vossou, Demy, Katy Garbi, Vegas, Kalomira and Claydee.

At Eurovision 
The Eurovision Song Contest 2014 took place at B&W Hallerne in Copenhagen, Denmark. It consisted of two semi-finals held on 6 and 8 May, respectively, and the grand final on 10 May 2014. The European Broadcasting Union split up the competing countries into six different pots based on voting patterns from previous contests, with countries with favourable voting histories put into the same pot. On 20 January 2014, an allocation draw was held at Copenhagen City Hall that placed each country into one of the two semi-finals, with Greece being placed into the second half of the second semi-final. Once all of the competing songs for the Eurovision Song Contest 2014 had been released, the running order for the semi-finals was decided by the producers of the event rather than through another draw. On 24 March, the running order was published, with the nation assigned position 12, following  and preceding .

Performances

Freaky Fortune and Riskykidd took part in technical rehearsals on 29 April and 2 May, followed by dress rehearsals on 5 and 6 May. This included the jury final where professional juries of each country, responsible for 50 percent of each country's vote, watched and voted on the competing entries.

Greece qualified from the second semi-final to compete in the final on 10 May 2014. During the winner's press conference for the second semi-final qualifiers, Greece was allocated to compete in the first half of the final. The result was the 20th place for the Greek delegation, which equaled their worst placing in the history of the country in the contest.

Voting 

Voting during the three shows involved each country awarding points from 1-8, 10 and 12 as determined by a combination of 50% national jury and 50% televoting. Each nation's jury consisted of five music industry professionals who are citizens of the country they represent. This jury judged each entry based on: vocal capacity; the stage performance; the song's composition and originality; and the overall impression by the act. In addition, no member of a national jury was permitted to be related in any way to any of the competing acts in such a way that they cannot vote impartially and independently. In the second semi-final, Greece placed seventh with 74 points, which included the top 12 points from Belarus. In the final, Greece placed 20th with 35 points, with its highest point award being 7 from Armenia. The nation awarded 12 points to eventual contest winner Austria in both the second semi-final and final. Andrianna Maggania was the Greek spokesperson announcing the country's voting results during the shows. The tables below visualise a complete breakdown of points awarded to Greece in both the second semi-final and the final of the Eurovision Song Contest 2014, as well as by the country on both occasions.

Points awarded to Greece

Points awarded by Greece

Detailed voting results
The following members comprised the Greek jury:
 Vasilios Apergis (jury chairperson)music producer
 Konstantinos Pantzoglouradio music producer, journalist
 Rodanthi Papadealyricist
 Aggelos Makris (Mark F. Angelo)music producer, composer
 DJ, television presenter

References

2014
Countries in the Eurovision Song Contest 2014
Eurovision